Taipei Adventist American School (TAAS) is a private foreign-registered elementary school with an American-based curriculum located on Yangming Shan (陽明山) in the Shihlin District of Taipei City, Taiwan.  It is administered under the Northern Asia-Pacific Division of the Seventh-day Adventist Church.

History 

Taipei Adventist American School had its beginnings in 1955 as a small home-style school for overseas missionaries of the Seventh-day Adventist Church and doctors of Taiwan Adventist Hospital who mostly came from North America to pioneer the SDA mission work in China, Hong Kong, and Taiwan. 

In the early 1950's, due to China's changing political climate, missionaries for the church were forced to locate outside of the country.  Many of these missionaries came to Taiwan.  At the same time, the Taiwan Adventist Hospital was built with the help of the Taiwan church, Taiwan government, and the US government. This led to an influx of foreign Adventist doctors with families who wanted to serve the needs of the church in Taiwan.

At first, the school was located behind Taiwan Adventist Hospital in the basement of the dormitories used by workers of the hospital. The first teacher to serve at this location was Miss Paterson, a kind and gentle woman that the kids adored.  To help support the school, the head of the Taiwan Theological Institute, Mr. Carter and Mr. Abby, their business manager, provided the day to day administrative work to keep the English Missionary School going. This home-style school provided an American education up to the eighth grade. After graduation, most students transferred to Singapore Adventist Academy in Singapore.

During this time, the school grew slowly with its students primarily being children of the doctors in the hospital, missionary families stationed in Taiwan, and some of the families of the officers of the American Military stationed in Taiwan. At this time, there was also a growing number of children of teachers from the campus of the Taiwan Theological Institute (later it was moved and renamed Taiwan Adventist College) in the Qizhang area of the Xindian district of Suburban Taipei. These kids would be driven all the way up to the hospital daily to attend classes.

The school was located in the basement of the dormitory building on the hospital compound with a small playground and lots of room for kids to run around and play in the gardens outside. Over time, this space grew too small to provide the right kind of outdoor space that American parents expected. Also, the school was on the campus of a hospital that was growing and needed all their available space. By the early 80's, the school, needing more room for the modest increase in the number of students that were desiring an American Education, again decided it was best to move to a larger location. 

Meanwhile, in the late 1970's, some land on Yangming Shan had been donated to the Adventist church in Taiwan by a generous family that wanted to see the school expand and provide more room for students.  At first, this land was used by many of the Taiwan Adventist Hospital Doctors and other missionary families for housing, as there was a western style compound with six homes and two large grassy areas for play and gardening, but was later abandoned due to the inconvenience of hospital personnel traveling back and forth from the hospital compound.

In 1984, the school board voted to build a new school building on this large piece of land on Yangming Shan.  This was not without its difficulties, but with God's help in the form of help from the US embassy, TAAS was able to build its own building and become an established government-recognized school. 

By 1986, a three-level building was constructed with two apartments downstairs and a fenced-in play area on the third floor, with classrooms, a library, offices and bathrooms on the second floor. Unfortunately, during this time, Taiwan changed its rules on foreign doctors practicing medicine in the country and nearly all the foreign doctors at the hospital left the country with their families.  Also, about the same time, official US relations ended, meaning that all of the military officer families would also be transferred out. Now there was only a small group of missionary families that were left.

In 1991, the school was registered with the Taiwan government as a foreign school for international students. This allowed any student with a foreign passport to attend the school.  The growth age of the school happened during Joanne Lefever's duration as principal of TAAS. As she grew the population of the school from 15 children of missionaries to over 120 students, renovations took place to accommodate the growing size.

Over successive remodels during the 1990s, 2000s, and 2010s, the school transformed to three levels of classrooms with grades one to four on the third floor, grades five to seven on the second floor, and eighth grade, administrative offices, work space, storage, and a technology lab on the first floor.

In 2010 and 2016, the school converted one of the compound's houses into more classroom and work space by remodeling it for Chinese and EAL classrooms, learning support offices, music rooms, and a multipurpose kitchen work space.

Campus 

The current  campus consists of:

A main building with eight classrooms with one grade per class room, one ELL pullout classroom, two administrative offices, two auxiliary staff offices, a computer lab, and a science lab.
A Language Learning (EAL) building with one EAL homeroom class, and one classroom for students to be pulled out from regular classes for extra English help, two Chinese language classrooms, one learning support staff office, and a large music room.
A covered gym area for Physical Education.
One large open grass field with adjacent play ground.
A large grass soccer/sports field.
Four western style faculty homes.
An adjacent property with a large three story 100 year old traditional farmhouse that holds a multi-purpose meeting room, offices, a guest room, a board room and two faculty houses. There is also another 4 acres of park-like grounds.

Academics 
TAAS specializes in holistic individualized American-style instruction in a way not possible in a larger school setting. As part of the Adventist education system TAAS focuses on intellectual, spiritual, physical, and social education.  TAAS believes that in a smaller family-type setting with a lower student/teacher ratio that not only is learning benefited, but social development is also enhanced. In fact students consistently score 12 months or 1 grade level ahead of their American peers.   Children that are part of the SDA education system become more independent and do better academically because the “teachers have higher expectations of students and encourage them to take hard classes. They are more likely to support the notion that ‘God doesn’t make junk’ and that students are often capable of achieving more than they realize."

Because of the western-style education students are encouraged to take responsibilities for their own learning apart from the pressures of the teacher or other authorities. Students learn how to act independently and act cooperatively. Christian morals and values are another integral part of the education system. Integrity, honesty, respect for others, and responsibility are cultivated.

TAAS offers learning support services for children with mild to significant need.

Almost 100 percent of TAAS graduates continue their education at another American-based curriculum institution either in Taiwan or abroad. The vast majority choose to continue at The Primacy Collegiate Academy, Taipei American School, Taipei European School, or another school in the United States.

TAAS is accredited by the Adventist Accrediting Association.

Student body 

The combined K-8 school enrollment is approximately 120. The student body is made up of 17 different nationalities with the majority being American, Canadian, Korean, Japanese, and Philippine, respectively. TAAS abides by the Republic of China Foreign Schools Law, which requires all international schools to only admit students who hold non-ROC (Taiwan) passports.

See also 
 The Primacy Collegiate Academy
 Taiwan Adventist International School

References

External links 
Official website

International schools in Taipei
American international schools in Taiwan
Schools in Taipei
1950s establishments in Taiwan